is a former Japanese football player. His father Yoshikazu is also a footballer.

Club career
Nagai was born in Tokyo on July 12, 1982. After graduating from high school, he joined Kashiwa Reysol in 2001. However he did not play many matches and he moved to Mito HollyHock in August 2004. He became a regular player. He returned to Reysol in 2006. Although he played many matches until 2007, his opportunity to play decreased from 2008. He moved to Ehime FC in June 2009. He retired end of 2009 season.

National team career
In June 2001, Nagai was selected Japan U-20 national team for 2001 World Youth Championship. But he did not play in the match.

Club statistics

References

External links

1982 births
Living people
Association football people from Tokyo
Japanese footballers
J1 League players
J2 League players
Kashiwa Reysol players
Mito HollyHock players
Ehime FC players
Association football midfielders